Maendeleo Ya Wanawake Organisation (MYWO) is a women's NGO that deals with issues to do with women's rights and gender equity in Kenya. It was founded by Zipporah Kittony in 1952 and has approximately 600,000 groups contributing to a total membership of about two million women. It is currently chaired by Rukia Subow and has various agendas in its mission statement, including maternal, child health and family planning and training women in leadership and development.

Historically it was promoted by the British during their colonial rule over Kenya and helped provide services only for those against the Mau Mau anti-colonial uprising.

Ruth Habwe served as secretary general of the organization from 1968 until 1971.

References

External links
 Official website

Women's organisations based in Kenya
Organizations established in 1952
1952 establishments in Kenya